Maggard is an unincorporated community within Magoffin County, Kentucky, United States, lying along Kentucky Route 1081 (aka Coon Creek Road).  As of 2015, it consists of a general store, a bar, and several houses, often associated with small farms, stretched along the highway.  A garage-service station is closed, and there are no other services or businesses.  For the most part, the town is split by the highway into a hilly rise along one side and a dell along the other, each accommodating inhabited structures.

References

Unincorporated communities in Magoffin County, Kentucky
Unincorporated communities in Kentucky